Antônio Fernandes, also known as Antoninho (13 August 1921 – 16 December 1973), was a Brazilian professional football player and manager. He was nicknamed O arquiteto da bola ("architect of the ball") after São Paulo's victorious campaign in the Campeonato Brasileiro de Seleções Estaduais in 1952. At Santos, he would play 400 games from 1941 to 1954, scoring 145 goals. In 1948 and 1950, his team finished as high as second in São Paulo. After leaving Santos, he would play two more seasons at Jabaquara before ending his playing career.

He then became an assistant coach at Santos under Lula, and later head coach for Atlético Mineiro. He returned to Santos once again to take over for Lula in 1966, leading Os Santásticos to their second Campeonato Paulista title. In 1968, they won the Torneio Roberto Gomes Pedrosa, predecessor to the Brasileirão, and the Recopa Sudamericana, along with many other domestic and international tournaments. Upon leaving Santos in 1971, he was replaced by fellow Peixe great Mauro Ramos.

References

External links 
 http://antigo.miltonneves.com.br/QFL/Conteudo.aspx?ID=61112

1921 births
1973 deaths
Sportspeople from Santos, São Paulo
Brazilian footballers
Brazilian football managers
Santos FC players
Canto do Rio Foot-Ball Club managers
Clube Atlético Mineiro managers
Fluminense FC managers
Santos FC managers
Figueirense FC managers
Clube Náutico Capibaribe managers
Esporte Clube Noroeste managers
Association football midfielders